The 2016 Premier Futsal was the inaugural tournament of Premier Futsal. The season featured six teams, each playing four matches before culminating to the finals. The league started on 15 July 2016 and ended on 24 July 2016.

Mumbai won the inaugural season by defeating Kochi 3-2 on penalties via sudden death.

Teams

Stadiums and locations

Marquee players 
List of marquee players:

 Ronaldinho was replaced by Cafu as the marquee player for Goa.

Squads

Rules
Note: Premier Futsal tournament does not follow all the rules of international Futsal.

Rules of 2016 Premier Futsal
 4 quarters, 10 minutes each.
 No offsides.
 Throw-in instead of kick-in when ball goes out of play.
 Throw-in, penalty, keeper's release will have to be completed within 5 seconds.
 5 players per team, unlimited rolling substitutes.
 Specially designed ball – Size 4.
 After 5, each foul lead to a penalty.

Penalty Shootout
 5 penalties each.
 Penalty taker has 5 seconds to score.
 Unlimited touches of the ball.
 Deliberate foul by Goalkeeper or preventing a goalscoring chance is a goal.
 Foul by attacker is a miss.

Group stage

Group A

Group B

Knockout stage

Semi-finals

Final

Tournament team rankings
Premier League Futsal     

|}

Season statistics

Most Goals

Hat-tricks

Awards

Player of the Match

End-of-season awards

Telecast
Sony Pictures Networks India Pvt. Ltd. acquired exclusive rights to broadcast Premier Futsal. As part of the agreement, all Premier Futsal matches will be televised live on Sony SIX, Sony ESPN and Sony Aath. Matches will also be available to live stream on Sony LIV.

See also 
 2016 Premier Futsal season squads
 Premier Futsal

References 

2016
2016 in Indian sport